Peel station is a Montreal Metro station in the borough of Ville-Marie in Montreal, Quebec, Canada. It is operated by the Société de transport de Montréal (STM) and serves the Green Line. The station opened on October 14, 1966, as part of the original network of the Metro.

Architecture and art

Designed by Papineau, Gérin-Lajoie, and Leblanc, it is a normal side platform station, built in open-cut under boul. De Maisonneuve. Its mezzanine floats within the open-cut volume, supported by pillars and beams, and contains ticket barriers at either end with the fare-paid zone in the centre. There are two entrances at the west end of the station, one with shops and services, and three at the east end, including underground city access to Les Cours Mont-Royal and points east. All of the street entrances are integrated into other buildings.

A circular theme is present throughout the station's decor: there are bright single colour circles on light panels surrounding the advertising posters, circles in the marble of one entrance, circular tiles on the floor and walls, but the best-known works of art in the station, and the main artwork, are a series of 54 large circles (of which 37 remain) by Jean-Paul Mousseau, one of the few artworks to be integrated into the architecture of the original network rather than commissioned later. Created in collaboration with ceramist Claude Vermette, these circles, set in floors and walls throughout the station, are mainly in tones of orange or blue streaked with other colours. A sculpture by Maurice Lemieux entitled Enterspace stands outside the Peel Nord entrance.

Origin of the name

The station is named for Peel Street, which in turn was named for Sir Robert Peel, British Prime Minister from 1834 to 1835 and again from 1841 to 1846. He is best known for creating London's police department while Home Secretary, thus giving them their nickname of "Bobbies."

Connecting bus routes

Nearby points of interest

 Tour CIBC
 Sun Life Building
 McGill University (McLennan Library, Shatner Bldg., etc.)
 Dorchester Square
 Dominion Square Building
 CKMI-DT / Global studios
 Les Cours Mont-Royal
 Ogilvy's department store
 Holt Renfrew
 Redpath Museum
 Saint Catherine Street
 Sherbrooke Street
 Crescent Street (nightclubs, bars, street festivals)
 De Maisonneuve Boulevard
 The Underground City

Exits
 Peel Street (West) Exit: 1115 De Maisonneuve Boulevard West
 Peel Street (East) Exit: 1011 de Maisonneuve Blvd. West
 Metcalfe Street Exit: 1008 de Maisonneuve Blvd. West
 Stanley Street Exit: 1465 Stanley Street

References

External links

Peel Station - official site
Montreal by Metro, metrodemontreal.com - photos, information, and trivia
 2011 STM System Map
 2011 Downtown System Map
 Metro Map

Green Line (Montreal Metro)
Railway stations in Canada opened in 1966
Downtown Montreal